Havraň is a municipality and village in Most District in the Ústí nad Labem Region of the Czech Republic. It has about 600 inhabitants.

Administrative parts
Villages of Moravěves and Saběnice are administrative parts of Havraň.

References

Villages in Most District